Sayuki is a feminine Japanese given name. Notable people with the name include:

Fiona Graham, an Australian anthropologist and professional geisha named Sayuki
Sayuki Takagi (born 1997), a Japanese pop singer

Fictional characters
 Sayuki Ayase, a character in the Your Diary visual novel
 Sayuki Katagiri, a character in the light novel and anime series Lovely Idol
 Sayuki Kuroda, a character in the visual novel Girls Beyond the Wasteland
 Sayuki Manaka, a character in the media series Duel Masters
 Sayuki Sakurai, a character in the manga series Chocolate Cosmos
 Sayuki Shirakawa, a character in the visual novel series A Kiss for the Petals
 Sayuki Takigawa, a character in the 22/7 anime TV series
 Sayuki Tezuka, a character in the game and anime series Night Shift Nurses
 Sayuki Tokihara, a character in the light novel series Hensuki

See also
Heavenly Guardian, a 2007 video game known as Legend of Sayuki in Europe

Japanese feminine given names